This is a list of notable Jewish American computer scientists.  For other Jewish Americans, see Lists of Jewish Americans.

 Hal Abelson; artificial intelligence
 Leonard Adleman; RSA cryptography, DNA computing, Turing Award (2002)
 Adi Shamir; RSA cryptography, DNA computing, Turing Award (2002)
 Paul Baran, Polish-born engineer; co-invented packet switching
 Lenore and Manuel Blum (Turing Award (1995)), Venezuelan-American computer scientist; computational complexity, parents of Avrim Blum (Co-training)
 Dan Bricklin, creator of the original spreadsheet
 Sergey Brin; co-founder of Google
 Danny Cohen, Israeli-American Internet pioneer; first to run a visual flight simulator across the ARPANet
 Robert Fano, Italian-American information theorist
 Ed Feigenbaum; artificial intelligence, Turing Award (1994)
 William F. Friedman, cryptologist
 Herbert Gelernter, father of Unabomber victim David Gelernter;artificial intelligence
 Richard D. Gitlin; co-inventor of the digital subscriber line (DSL)
 Adele Goldberg; Smalltalk design team
 Shafi Goldwasser, Israeli-American cryptographer; Turing Award (2013) 
 Philip Greenspun; web applications
 Frank Heart; co-designed the first routing computer for the ARPANET, the forerunner of the internet
 Martin Hellman; public key cryptography, co-inventor of the Diffie–Hellman key exchange protocol, Turing Award (2015)
 Douglas Hofstadter, author of Gödel, Escher, Bach and other publications (half Jewish)
 Bob Kahn; co-invented TCP and IP, Presidential Medal of Freedom, Turing Award (2004)
 Richard M. Karp; computational complexity, Turing Award (1985)
 John Kemeny, Hungarian-born co-developer of BASIC
 Leonard Kleinrock; packet switching
 John Klensin; i18n, SMTP, MIME
 Solomon Kullback, cryptographer
 Ray Kurzweil; OCR, speech recognition
 Jaron Lanier, virtual reality pioneer
 Leonid Levin, Soviet Ukraine-born computer scientist; computational complexity, Knuth Prize (2012)
 Barbara Liskov (born Huberman), first woman to be granted a doctorate in computer science in the United States; Turing Award (2008)
 Udi Manber, Israeli-American computer scientist; agrep, GLIMPSE, suffix array, search engines
 John McCarthy; artificial intelligence, LISP programming language, Turing Award (1971)
 Jack Minker; database logic
 Marvin Minsky; artificial intelligence, neural nets, Turing Award (1969); co-founder of MIT's AI laboratory
 John von Neumann (born Neumann János Lajos), Hungarian-American computer scientist, mathematician and economist
 Seymour Papert, South African-born co-inventor — with Wally Feurzeig and Cynthia Solomon — of the Logo programming language
 Judea Pearl, Israeli-American AI scientist; developer of Bayesian networks; father of Daniel Pearl, who was kidnapped and later beheaded by rebels in Pakistan
 Alan J. Perlis; compilers, Turing Award (1966)
 Frank Rosenblatt; invented an artificial intelligence program called "Perceptrons" (1960)
 Radia Perlman; inventor of the Spanning Tree Protocol
 Azriel Rosenfeld; image analysis
 Michael Rothman; UEFI
 Ben Shneiderman; human-computer interaction, information visualization
 Abraham Silberschatz, databases, operating systems
 Herbert A. Simon, cognitive and computer scientist; Turing Award (1975)
 Abraham Sinkov, cryptanalyst; NSA Hall of Honor (1999)
 Gustave Solomon, mathematician and electrical engineer; one of the founders of the algebraic theory of error detection and correction
 Ray Solomonoff; algorithmic information theory
 Richard Stallman; designed the GNU operating system, founder of the Free Software Foundation (FSF)
 Andrew S. Tanenbaum, American-Dutch computer scientist; creator of MINIX
 Warren Teitelman; autocorrect, Undo/Redo, Interlisp
 Larry Tesler; Cut, copy, and paste
 Jeffrey Ullman; compilers, theory of computation, data-structures, databases, awarded Knuth Prize (2000)
 Peter J. Weinberger; contributed to the design of the AWK programming language (he is the "W" in AWK), and the FORTRAN compiler FORTRAN 77
 Joseph Weizenbaum, German-born computer scientist; developer of ELIZA; the Weizenbaum Award is named after him
 Norbert Wiener; cybernetics
 Terry Winograd; SHRDLU
 Jacob Wolfowitz, Polish-born information theorist
 Stephen Wolfram, British-American computer scientist; designer of the Wolfram Language
 Lotfi Zadeh, Azerbaijan SSR-born computer scientist; inventor of Fuzzy logic (Jewish mother, Azerbaijani father)

References

Computer scientists
Jewish American
Computer scientists